The Arizona Complex League Mariners are a Rookie-level affiliate of the Seattle Mariners, competing in the Arizona Complex League of Minor League Baseball. The team plays its home games at Peoria Sports Complex in Peoria, Arizona. The team is composed mainly of players who are in their first year of professional baseball either as draftees or non-drafted free agents.

History
The team first competed in the Arizona League (AZL) in 1988, as a cooperative between the Seattle Mariners and the Boston Red Sox known as the Arizona League Red Sox/Mariners. In 1989, the team became an affiliate solely of the Mariners, and was renamed as such. The team has operated continuously in Arizona since then. Prior to the 2021 season, the Arizona League was renamed as the Arizona Complex League (ACL).

Season-by-season record

Statistics
Mariners team statistics, and top hitter and pitcher statistics, by season

Roster

References

External links
 Arizona League Mariners Official Site

Arizona Complex League teams
Boston Red Sox minor league affiliates
Professional baseball teams in Arizona
Seattle Mariners minor league affiliates
Baseball teams established in 1989
Sports in Phoenix, Arizona
1989 establishments in Arizona